The Chairperson of the Personal Information Protection Commission is the Chairperson of the Personal Information Protection Commission in South Korea. As head of the commission, the Chairperson represents the Personal Information Protection Commission.

Appointment and Duties 
According to 'Personal Information Protection Act (PIPA)' amended in 2020 article 7-2(2), the chairperson is recommended by the Prime minister and appointed by the President. Currently in year 2022, this appointment procedure does not require legislature consent or hearing.

Yet as one of the nine commissioners constituting the commission, candidate for the chair should fulfill one of following career requirement under article 7-2(2); Civil service with Grade III or higher on data protection, or more than 10 years as lawyer, or more than 3 years as executive in organization specialized in data protection, or more than 5 years as professor in universities.

The chairperson has following powers and duties according to the PIPA.
 By article 7-2(2), the chair nominates two of nine commissioners in the commission, to be appointed by the President. 
 By article 7-3(1), the chair presides every session of the commission, and handles administrative task of the commission.
 By article 7-3(3) and (4), the chair can participate and speak opinion in the National Assembly or the State Council on tasks of the commission.

Tenure and Treatment 
After reformation of the Commission in 2020, the chair is now treated as equal as other minister in South Korean government. It has three-year tenure and protected from removal during its term by article 7-4 and 7–5. This status guarantees role of the commission as independent agency on data protection affairs.

List of the Chairs

List of Chairs before PIPC as central administrative agency

List of Chairs after PIPC as central administrative agency

See also 
 Personal Information Protection Commission (South Korea)
 National data protection authority
 State Council of South Korea

References

External links 
 Official website of PIPC in English

Chairpersons of the Personal Information Protection Commission of South Korea